NASA's Independent Verification & Validation (IV&V) Program was established in 1993 as part of an agency-wide strategy to provide the highest achievable levels of safety and cost-effectiveness for mission critical software. NASA's IV&V Program was founded under the NASA Office of Safety and Mission Assurance (OSMA) as a direct result of recommendations made by the National Research Council (NRC) and the Report of the Presidential Commission on the Space Shuttle Challenger disaster. 
Since then, NASA's IV&V Program has experienced growth in personnel, projects, capabilities, and accomplishments. NASA IV&V efforts have contributed to NASA's improved safety record since the program's inception. Today, Independent Verification and Validation (IV&V) is an Agency-level function, delegated from OSMA to Goddard Space Flight Center (GSFC) and managed by NASA IV&V. NASA's IV&V Program's primary business, software IV&V, is sponsored by OSMA as a software assurance technology. Having been reassigned as GSFC, NASA IV&V is Code 180 (Center Director's direct report).

NASA's IV&V Program houses approximately 270 employees and leverages the expertise of in-house partners and contractors. Its facilities are located in Fairmont, West Virginia. In the summer, high school and college interns are employed in addition.

On February 22, 2019, the facility was renamed to the Katherine Johnson Independent Verification and Validation Facility in honor of Katherine Johnson, an African-American woman who worked as a mathematician at NASA for 35 years and who is featured in the 2016 film Hidden Figures.

Affiliations 
NASA's IV&V Program is affiliated with NASA Goddard Space Flight Center (GSFC) and the Educator Resource Center (ERC), funded through a partnership with Fairmont State University, is part of a nationwide network of training sites at NASA centers and facilities.

Projects 
NASA's IV&V Program is the lead NASA organization for system software IV&V, and is responsible for the management of all system software IV&V efforts within the Agency. NASA's IV&V Program's role is to provide value-added service to the Agency's system software projects, primarily by appropriately performing IV&V on system software based on the cost, size, complexity, life span, risk, and consequences of failure.

Independent Technical Assessments of NASA Systems 
NASA's IV&V Program also provides independent technical assessments of NASA systems and software processes/products to identify developmental and operational risks. This effort helps to provide assurance that safe and reliable software is being provided to NASA missions and projects as they work toward successful systems and software development. Independent assessments can address any aspect of software engineering and can be applied within any SDLC phase. This capability provides for multiple spot-checking throughout the SDLC and addresses those issues that can jeopardize mission safety and quality.

Simulation-to-Flight 1 (STF-1) 
Simulation-to-Flight 1 (STF-1) is West Virginia’s first CubeSat, or small satellite. It was built under NASA’s CubeSat Launch Initiative, where potential launch opportunities are provided to select CubeSat proposals from NASA Centers, accredited US educational or non-profit organizations. NASA's main goal in this initiative is to provide CubeSat developers access to a low-cost pathway to conduct research in the areas of science, exploration, technology development, education or operations. JSTAR’s main goal in this mission is to fully demonstrate the capabilities of the NASA Operational Simulation (NOS) technologies, most notably its development of the NASA Operational Simulation for Small Satellites, or NOS3.
JSTAR had a huge outreach opportunity with West Virginia University through the support of NASA IV&V and West Virginia Space Grants Consortium (WVSGC). By being partnered with JSTAR engineers and scientists, WVU Engineering, Computer Science, and Physics departments got to learn first-hand the rewards and challenges involved in working in any STEM career such as with NASA. More specifically, WVU provided their experimental ideas and worked alongside the JSTAR team to incorporate their scientific instruments into STF-1.
Along with offering their professional project management, JSTAR has supported WVU in their scientific development and research. By offering their software resources to this CubeSat, STF-1 has the capability of recording data once it is launched into orbit around Earth—data that can be sent directly to WVU for STEM research and the education of future scientists.
While community outreach is a huge component of this mission, major benefits for NASA and JSTAR have come of it as well.

In the development of these NASA Operational Simulation technologies and their demonstrations in the STF-1 mission, the IV&V tool-set has been matured to better support current and future NASA missions.
For example, these NOS technologies, among them NOS3, have demonstrated significant value in several areas such as: the James Webb Space Telescope, Global Precipitation Measurement, Juno, and Deep Space Climate Observatory in the areas of software development, mission operations/training, verification and validation, test procedure development, and software systems check-out.

STF-1 launched into Low Earth orbit on a Rocket Lab Electron rocket on December 16, 2018. As of now, STF-1 is orbiting earth in LEO and operating nominally.

Educator Resource Center 
Thanks to a grant with Fairmont State University, the Independent Verification and Validation Program Educator Resource Center (ERC) provides resources and training opportunities for approximately 1,000 in-service, pre-service, and informal educators and in West Virginia annually. The materials and training cover a wide range of science, technology, engineering, and mathematics (STEM) topics. The ERC also loans hands-on STEM kits to trained teachers which impact over 10,000 students per year in the state.  The on-site student outreach program brings over 2,000 youth to the facility annually to experience workshops on robotics, rocketry, aviation, and other STEM topics.  The ERC also runs numerous student STEM competitions in the fields of robotics and aviation.  Starting in 2012 the ERC became the partner for the FIRST LEGO League competition and has overseen a rapid growth in robotic competitions that now include over 100 teams at 10 tournaments statewide each fall.

See also 

Verification and validation

References

External links 
Current projects
NASA IV&V Facility
NASA ERC Network

Buildings and structures in Marion County, West Virginia
Goddard Space Flight Center
Government agencies established in 1993
Independent Verification and Validation Program
Space technology research institutes
Aerospace research institutes
Aviation research institutes